Australaena is a genus of  anyphaenid sac spiders first described by Lucien Berland in 1942. it contains only two species.

References

Anyphaenidae
Araneomorphae genera
Spiders of Oceania
Taxa named by Lucien Berland